Ernst Frederick II, Duke of Saxe-Hildburghausen (17 December 1707 in Hildburghausen – 13 August 1745 in Hildburghausen), was a duke of Saxe-Hildburghausen.

Young duke
He was the third but eldest surviving son of Ernst Frederick I, Duke of Saxe-Hildburghausen and Countess Sophia Albertine of Erbach-Erbach. At the age of 16, he succeeded his father as Duke of Saxe-Hildburghausen in 1724. As a result, his mother, the Dowager Duchess Sophia Albertine, acted as a regent on his behalf until he reached adulthood five years later.

Appointments
In 1743 he received an Infantry Regiment from Charles Theodore, Elector of Bavaria as a Lieutenant-General. Later, Charles VII, Holy Roman Emperor appointed him Quartermaster-General.

Always ailing in body and mind, he was helpless in the face of the problems of the duchy. In the meantime, the indebtedness of the duchy had become so high that total public revenues did not even cover the interest.

Family
In Fürstenau on 19 June 1726 Ernst Frederick married Caroline of Erbach-Fürstenau (d. July 1745). They had four children:
 Ernst Frederick III Karl, Duke of Saxe-Hildburghausen (b. Königsberg, 10 June 1727 – d. Seidingstadt, 23 September 1780).
 Frederick August Albrecht (b. Hildburghausen, 8 August 1728 – d. Hildburghausen, 14 June 1735).
 Frederick Wilhelm Eugen (b. Hildburghausen, 8 October 1730 – d. Öhringen, 4 December 1795), married on 13 March 1778 to his niece Caroline of Saxe-Hildburghausen (daughter of Ernst Frederick III). Their marriage was childless.
 Sophie Amalie Caroline (b. Hildburghausen, 21 July 1732 – d. Öhringen, 19 June 1799), married in 1749 to Ludwig of Hohenlohe-Neuenstein-Öhringen.

Ancestors

References 
 Johann Samuel Ersch (Hrsg.): Allgemeine Encyclopädie der Wissenschaften und Künste, 1. Sektion, 37. Teil, Leipzig, 1842, S. 300 (Digitalisat)
 Heinrich Ferdinand Schoeppl: Die Herzoge von Sachsen-Altenburg. Bozen 1917, Neudruck Altenburg 1992
 Georg Hassel: ''Allg. Europäisches Staats u. Address: Handbuch, 1816, etc, Band 1-2, Weimar, 1816, S. 324 (Digitalisat)

1707 births
1745 deaths
People from Hildburghausen
House of Saxe-Hildburghausen
Dukes of Saxe-Hildburghausen
People from Saxe-Hildburghausen
Knights of the Golden Fleece of Austria
Recipients of the Order of the White Eagle (Poland)